Emma Elizabeth Thompson (born 2 December 1990) is an Australian cricketer who plays as a right-handed batter and occasional right-arm medium bowler for the Tasmanian Tigers in the Women's National Cricket League (WNCL). Originally from Sydney, Thompson played for several years in the New South Wales U17 ("Under 17") and U19 squads.  She then sought further opportunities in Tasmania, where she became a key player for Tasmania.

Thompson was included in the Hobart Hurricanes squad for its inaugural WBBL01 season (2015–16), and was again selected for the WBBL02 season (2016–17).  She is not one of the big guns in the WBBL, and sometimes plays essentially as a specialist fielder, a role she accepts without rancour. In November 2018, she was named in the Hobart Hurricanes' squad for the 2018–19 Women's Big Bash League season.

Off the field, Thompson works as a physiotherapist.

References

External links

Emma Thompson at Cricket Australia

1990 births
Australian women cricketers
Cricketers from Sydney
Hobart Hurricanes (WBBL) cricketers
Living people
Sportswomen from New South Wales
Tasmanian Tigers (women's cricket) cricketers